The 1979 Edmonton Eskimos finished in 1st place in the Western Conference with a 12–2–2 record and repeated as Grey Cup champions after winning the 67th Grey Cup.

Pre-season

Schedule

Regular season

Season Standings

Season schedule

Total attendance: 340,327 
Average attendance: 42,541 (99.4%)

Playoffs

Grey Cup

Awards and honours
Annis Stukus Trophy – Hugh Campbell
CFL's Most Outstanding Canadian Award – Dave "Dr. Death" Fennell
CFL's Most Outstanding Offensive Lineman Award – Mike Wilson (OT)
CFL's Most Outstanding Rookie Award – Brian Kelly (WR)
Dr. Beattie Martin Trophy – Dave Fennell

References

Edmonton Elks seasons
Grey Cup championship seasons
N. J. Taylor Trophy championship seasons
1979 Canadian Football League season by team